Khalil Muhammad Issa, better known by his nom de guerre Abu Ibrahim al-Kabir, was a Palestinian Arab commander during the 1936-39 Arab revolt in Palestine.

Life
Abu Ibrahim worked as a laborer of sorts in Haifa. It was at that time, in the 1920s, that he became a close disciple of Izz ad-Din al-Qassam. Al-Qassam had been organizing the peasants and urban dwellers of northern Palestine into an armed movement. Abu Ibrahim advocated that the movement should have commenced a revolt against the British colonial authorities in Palestine immediately in the wake of the 1929 riots so as not to allow the British an opportunity to further clamp down and weaken the Palestinian community.

Following al-Qassam's death in 1935, he and other deputies of al-Qassam, such as Farhan al-Sa'di and Attiyah Abu Awad, took command of rebel bands. Together, they spearheaded the 1936 revolt. Abu Ibrahim was among the leading commanders of Palestinian rebels in the Upper Galilee. His unit, which drew Qassamiyun from the villages between Haifa and Saffuriya, called themselves "al-Darawish", which translates as "the Dervishes".

In October 1937, a headquarters for the revolt was set up in Damascus, Syria, known as the Central Committee of National Jihad in Palestine, Abu Ibrahim became the sole actual rebel commander serving on the committee. Abu Ibrahim was adept at raising funds and procuring weapons for the armed struggle. Although he based himself in Damascus, he would regularly enter Palestine to assess his group's situation and pay them their stipends. In 1938, he personally led an assault against the Jewish neighborhoods of Tiberias, which resulted in the deaths of 19 Jewish residents. According to contemporary accounts of some Palestinians, Abu Ibrahim also oversaw the campaign to eliminate Palestinian individuals who cooperated with the British authorities in the Galilee.

Unlike many of his comrades, Abu Ibrahim survived the revolt and was reportedly alive as of 1972.

References

Bibliography

Arab people in Mandatory Palestine
Rebel commanders of the 1936–1939 Arab revolt in Palestine
People from Haifa
Year of birth unknown